Qualey is an unincorporated community in Washington County, in the U.S. state of Ohio.

History
A post office called Qualey was established in 1891, and remained in operation until 1918. The community has the name of Michael Qualey, the original owner of the town site.

References

Unincorporated communities in Washington County, Ohio
Unincorporated communities in Ohio